Landkreis (district) Ebersberg is located in Upper Bavaria, Germany. It is bounded by (from the north and clockwise) the districts of Erding, Mühldorf, Rosenheim and Munich.

History
The most important event in the district's history was the battle of Hohenlinden on December 3, 1800, which was a part of the Napoleonic Wars.

Geography
The district includes rural areas east of the city of Munich. Despite the vicinity of Munich urbanisation is low. In the north there is a contiguous forest area of 80 km², serving as a recreation area for the population of the Bavarian capital. The forest consists of three separate unincorporated areas, Anzinger Forst, Ebersberger Forst, and Eglhartinger Forst.

Coat of arms
The arms display both parts of the word "Ebersberg": a boar (German "Eber") standing on a mountain (German "Berg"). These two symbols are part of the arms of the city of Ebersberg as well. In addition the district's arms include a fir, symbolising the forests of the region.

Towns and municipalities

Unincorporated Areas
Anzinger Forst
Ebersberger Forst
Eglhartinger Forst

References

External links

 Official website (German)

 
Districts of Bavaria